Xeon W is a brand of x86 processors designed, manufactured, and marketed by Intel, targeted at the workstation market.  The brand has been used for processors under several architectures:
  Intel Skylake workstation processors (first released 2017)
  Intel Cascade Lake workstation processors (first released 2019)
  Intel Comet Lake  workstation processors (first released 2020)
  Intel Rocket Lake  workstation processors (first released 2021)
  Intel Ice Lake  workstation processors (first released 2021)

See also
 List of Intel Xeon microprocessors